The 2004 congressional elections in Michigan was held on November 2, 2004 to determine who would represent the state of Michigan in the United States House of Representatives. Michigan had fifteen seats in the House, apportioned according to the 2000 United States Census. Representatives are elected for two-year terms.

Overview

References

2004 Michigan elections
2004
Michigan